is a Japanese-born Hong Kong professional footballer who currently plays for Hong Kong Premier League club Lee Man.

Club career

Citizen
On 16 December 2011, Nakamura scored a hat-trick against league leaders Sun Hei and end their 11 match unbeaten run.

On 7 March 2011, Nakamura scored for Citizen against Home United at Bishan Stadium, Singapore in the 2012 AFC Cup, but Home United FC fought back and won the match 3–1.

Lee Man
On 2 June 2020, Lee Man announced that Nakamura had joined the club.

International career
Nakamura received his Hong Kong passport in October 2018 and was called up to the Hong Kong team in the same month where he won his first cap against Indonesia.

Career statistics

Club
As of 31 March 2010

International

Honours
Pegasus
 Hong Kong Senior Shield: 2008–09

Kitchee
 Hong Kong Senior Shield: 2018–19
 Hong Kong FA Cup: 2018–19

References

External links
 
 

1987 births
Living people
People from Urayasu, Chiba
Hong Kong footballers
Hong Kong international footballers
Japanese footballers
Japanese emigrants to Hong Kong
Aoyama Gakuin University alumni
Japanese expatriate footballers
Hong Kong Premier League players
Expatriate footballers in Hong Kong
TSW Pegasus FC players
Citizen AA players
South China AA players
Tai Po FC players
Kitchee SC players
Lee Man FC players
Association football forwards
Naturalized footballers of Hong Kong